Capitol Lake is a 3 kilometer (1.9 mile) long,  artificial lake at the mouth of Deschutes River in Tumwater/Olympia, Washington. The Olympia Brewery sits on Capitol Lake in Tumwater, just downstream from where the Tumwater Falls meet the artificial lake. The Washington State Department of Enterprise Services (DES) manages the lake, as part of The Washington State Capitol Campus.

History
Prior to American settlement, the tidal basin at the southern tip of Budd Inlet was a productive shellfish gathering area for native peoples.  After settlement in the mid-19th century, the basin received much of the wastewater and other effluent outflow from "uptown" Olympia.  In the 1890s the Northern Pacific Railroad located a station and switching yard on the eastern shore of the basin.

The first proposal for creating Capitol Lake came when Leopold Schmidt of the Olympia Brewing Company proposed in 1895 to " mak(e) a fresh water lake of it by building a dam and locks near the Westside (Olympia) bridge."

In 1911, the State Capitol Commission held a nationwide competition for the design of the State Capitol Campus.  The winning architects, Wilder and White, submitted a revolutionary City Beautiful movement and American Renaissance plan which included creating a body of water to reflect the Capitol Group of buildings on the bluff by installing a tidelock at the mouth of the Deschutes River.

A more limited lake was also part of the original landscape design by John Olmsted to reflect the Washington State Capitol building on Puget Sound. The lake as envisioned by Olmsted would have been created with a north to south running berm, as opposed to an east to west running dam.

In 1915, the State Capitol Commission rejected a plan by former Olympia Mayor and state legislator P.H. Carlyon to replace Olympia's bridge to the westside with a dam and locks. That plan would have created a lake very much like the present Capitol Lake. Because of opposition from upriver Tumwater businesses, such as the Olympia Brewing Company and the Olympia Power and Light Company, that plan was not approved.

The Capitol Group of buildings was constructed over several years from 1913 to 1940, and the State Capitol Committee then turned to the task of creating the Wilder and White reflecting Capitol Lake. In 1937, the state began purchasing the privately owned tidelands around the Capitol Campus. In 1941, opposition from Tumwater was finally overcome during a special town meeting.  In 1947, due in large part by intense lobbying by Thurston County legislators, the state legislature approved funding for the construction of the dam in order to create Capitol Lake.

A shantytown known as "Little Hollywood" developed along the shores of the Deschutes River, at the foot of the Capitol Campus. 
The people living in the shanties dumped raw human waste and trash directly into the Deschutes River. This became an eyesore (July 7, 1948, The Daily Olympian)  and probably a health hazard. Damming the Deschutes River destroyed the estuary, but also prevented the urban blight of the shantytown from recurring.

Capitol Lake was finally created in 1951 when the dam was completed consistent with the Wilder and White plan.  This allowed for the retention of the outflow from the Deschutes River to cover the tide flats.

In the 1990s and 2000s, the North Capitol Campus Heritage Park was created with the Arc of Statehood from the Western Washington Inlet to the Eastern Washington Butte along the eastern edge of Capitol Lake and the North Campus trail and Law Enforcement Memorial with views across Capitol Lake to the borrowed landscapes of Puget Sound and the Olympic Mountains.

The February 2001 Nisqually earthquake did considerable damage to the 4th Avenue Bridge just north of the lake, as well as to the Deschutes Parkway on the west side of the lake. Capital Lakefair, centered on the lake, is held annually in July. The trail around the lake is 1.5 miles long.

Recommendation for Estuary Restoration

In 2009, after 12 years of intensive and independently verified scientific study, members of the Capitol Lake Aspect Insight Management reached a consensus regarding the Department of Natural Resource's efforts to remove the 5th Ave. dam and restore Deschutes Estuary. The DNR put out a report, and on page 6, issued this recommendation, stating:

"The Department of Fish and Wildlife, Department of Ecology, Department of Natural Resources, Squaxin Island Tribe, and a majority of the Thurston County Commissioners are forwarding their recommendation to return the Capitol Lake Basin to an estuary."

In response, CLAIM argued that the invasive species New Zealand Mud Snail (Potamopyrgus antipodarum) found within the lake are at such high quantities, that their potential to cause "unpredictable environmental degradation" suggests that their release into the Southern region of the Puget Sound should be avoided at all costs.

Biologist Howard Durrael, employee at CLAIM had this to say:

"We are undergoing efforts to manage the invasive mud snail population, but until population levels decrease by at minimum 78%, there can be no activity within or around the Lake."

Because of a high rate of siltation, the lake has been dredged periodically in the past to keep it from filling in.  After a 25-year hiatus, in 2011 the State Legislature appropriated $200,000 in order to seek permits to reimplement maintenance dredging in order to retain and improve Capitol Lake as part of the historic Wilder and White design of the State Capitol Campus during its centennial year.

Invasive Species 
In 2009, the New Zealand mud snail, an invasive species the size of a grain of rice, was discovered in Capitol Lake. The lake has been closed to all public use, including boating and other recreation, since 2009. A heavy cold snap in 2013, combined with a drawdown in water level in preparation, was roughly estimated to have killed 40–60% of the mudsnail population.

An infestation of Eurasian milfoil was controlled using herbicide in 2004. Later efforts relied on scuba divers to remove this invasive plant.

Controversy
Controversy surrounds Capitol Lake because it replaced the Deschutes River estuary. Because of a high rate of siltation, the lake was dredged periodically in the past to keep it from filling in, a classic case of eutrophication. Additionally, poor water quality has caused the lake to be closed to swimmers due to unsafe levels of E. coli.

In June 2012, the Washington State Department of Ecology released a report titled: Deschutes River, Capitol Lake, and Budd Inlet Temperature, Fecal Coliform Bacteria, Dissolved Oxygen, pH, and Fine Sediment Total Maximum Daily Load Technical Report - Water Quality Study Findings by scientists; Mindy Roberts, Anise Ahmed, Greg Pelletier, and David Osterberg.
This study provided information in a question and answer format.

References

External links
Information from Squaxin Tribe
Information from Dept. of General Administration
Capitol Lake Improvement and Protection Association
Deschutes Estuary Restoration Team

Artificial lakes of the United States
Geography of Olympia, Washington
Lakes of Thurston County, Washington